Rivergreen is a tram stop on the Nottingham Express Transit (NET) network in the city of Nottingham suburb of Clifton. It is situated on street track on Southchurch Drive near its junction with Rivergreen, and comprises a pair of side platforms flanking the running tracks. The stop is on line 2 of the NET, from Clifton via the city centre to Phoenix Park. Trams run at frequencies that vary between 4 and 8 trams per hour, depending on the day and time of day.

Rivergreen stop opened on 25 August 2015, along with the rest of NET's phase two.

References

External links

Nottingham Express Transit stops
Railway stations in Great Britain opened in 2015
Clifton, Nottinghamshire